Rennie Airth (born 1935) is a South African novelist who currently resides in Italy.  Airth has also worked as foreign correspondent for the Reuters news service.

Novels
His works include Snatch! (1969), Once A Spy (1981), and a series of murder mysteries set in England between 1921 and 1949 featuring Detective Inspector John Madden of Scotland Yard (later retired).  The first of these, River of Darkness (1999), won the Grand Prix de Littérature Policière for best international crime novel in 2000 and was nominated for Edgar, Anthony, and Macavity awards in the States. Airth found inspiration for that tale in a scrapbook about his uncle, a soldier killed in World War I. A sequel, The Blood-Dimmed Tide, was published in 2003, and a third book, The Dead of Winter, in 2009.  Although Airth initially intended to write a trilogy about Madden, in 2014 he produced a fourth entry in the series, The Reckoning, and followed that with The Death of Kings (2017).

Books
 Snatch (1969)
 Once A Spy (1981)
 Detective Inspector John Madden
 River of Darkness (1999)
 The Blood-Dimmed Tide (2004)
 The Dead of Winter (2009)
 The Reckoning (2014)
 The Death of Kings (2017)
 The Decent Inn of Death (2020)

References

External links
 The story behind The Reckoning - Essay by Rennie Airth on Upcoming4.me

1935 births
Living people
South African male novelists
South African expatriates in Italy
Alumni of Michaelhouse